Toxicology in Vitro is a peer-reviewed scientific journal covering in vitro toxicology. It is published semi-quarterly by Elsevier and an official journal of the European Society of Toxicology in Vitro and affiliated with the American Association for Cellular and Computational Toxicology. The editors-in-chief are Daniel Acosta (University of Cincinnati), Frank A. Barile (St. John's University), and Bas J. Blaauboer (Utrecht University). According to the Journal Citation Reports, the journal has a 2014 impact factor of 2.903, ranking it 29th out of 87 journals in the category "Toxicology".

References

External links 
 

Toxicology journals
Elsevier academic journals
Publications established in 1987
English-language journals
Bimonthly journals